Jinyun West railway station is a railway station in Jinyun County, Lishui, Zhejiang, China. It is an intermediate stop on the Jinhua–Wenzhou high-speed railway. It opened with the line on 26 December 2015.

See also 

 Jinyun railway station

References

Railway stations in Zhejiang
Railway stations in China opened in 2015
Jinyun County
Buildings and structures in Lishui